Maksim Igorevich Laykin (born 31 May 2003) is a Russian football player who plays for FC Neftekhimik Nizhnekamsk on loan from FC Spartak Moscow.

Club career
He made his debut in the Russian Football National League for FC Spartak-2 Moscow on 22 August 2020 in a game against FC Irtysh Omsk.

On 17 June 2022, Laykin joined FC Neftekhimik Nizhnekamsk.

References

External links
 
 Profile by Russian Football National League

2003 births
Sportspeople from Mordovia
People from Saransk
Living people
Russian footballers
Russia youth international footballers
Association football midfielders
FC Spartak-2 Moscow players
FC Neftekhimik Nizhnekamsk players
Russian First League players